Saigon, I Love You is a Vietnamese romantic comedy film produced by Ly Minh Thang in 2016. In 2017 it won a Golden Kite Prize by the Vietnam Cinematography Association for the best feature film, the highest distinction in Vietnamese cinema. In addition, it won Golden Kite prizes for best supporting actor (Huynh Lap), best screenplay, best production design, and best music. This is the first film directed by Ly Minh Thang.

The story, set in Saigon, describes five distinct plot lines related to ten individuals.

Accolades

Reception 
The film has won several awards including Best Feature Film at the Golden Kite awards, and saw a limited release in Australia where it was successful among Vietnamese Australians.

References

Vietnamese musical films
2010s romantic musical films